Love Letter is the fourth studio album by Canadian country music artist Jessie Farrell. It was released on August 30, 2011, by 604 Records. The album's first single is "Turn You Down."

Track listing

External links
Love Letter at 604 Records

2011 albums
604 Records albums
Jessie Farrell albums